Mumias East is a constituency in Kenya. It is one of twelve constituencies in Kakamega County.

References 

Constituencies in Kakamega County